Hang Seng China 50 Index is a pan-China stock market index to represent the top 50 China-based companies in the stock exchanges of Hong Kong, Shanghai and Shenzhen, which covers A share (shares circulated in mainland China), H share (shares circulated in Hong Kong from the mainland China incorporated company), red chip  (shares circulated in Hong Kong from the companies incorporated outside mainland China with state-owned background) and P chip  (shares circulated in Hong Kong from the companies with private background)

Components

Index tracking fund
 Hang Seng China 50 Index Fund by Hang Seng Investment Management Limited

References

External links
 

 
Chinese stock market indices
Hong Kong stock market indices
Hang Seng Bank stock market indices